Poneman is a surname. Notable people with the surname include:

 Daniel Poneman (born 1956), American government official
 Jonathan Poneman (born 1959), American record executive